The Latvian White is a breed of pig from Latvia. They have prick ears.

Reference

External links
 http://www.fao.org/docrep/009/ah759e/AH759E10.htm

Pig breeds originating in Latvia
Animal breeds originating in the Soviet Union